The Centre for Aerospace & Security Studies (CASS) is an independent research think tank founded by the Pakistan Air Force with specializations in the domains of aerospace, aviation industry, national security, doctrine, strategy, and economics. It was inaugurated by Air Chief Marshal Mujahid Anwar Khan in July 2019, with Air Chief Marshal Kaleem Saadat as its first President. CASS's current president is Air Marshal Farhat Hussain Khan (Retd). CASS is located at the Old Airport Road near PAF Base Nur Khan next to the Centre of Artificial Intelligence and Computing.

Objective

CASS defines its vision statement as "to serve as a thought leader in the Aerospace and Security domains globally, providing thinkers and policymakers with independent insight on aerospace and security issues in a comprehensive and multifaceted manner."

Areas of research

CASS specializes in the domains of aerospace, aviation industry, national security, doctrine, strategy, history, and economics. It publishes research in multiple languages including English and Urdu. It also advises government stakeholders on key issues of national interest

Biannual Conference
CASS' flagship conference is known as Global Strategic Threat and Response (GSTAR), which is attended by the President of Pakistan as Chief Guest. 

CASS is also the first think tank in Pakistan that has initiated a peer reviewed journal called "Journal of Aerospace & Security Studies" Journal of Aerospace & Security Studies"

Notable People
 Kaleem Saadat - Founding President, CASS
 Jalil Abbas Jilani - Advisor, Foreign Policy, CASS

See also 
 Centre for Aviation, Transport and Environment
 International Institute of Air and Space Law
 Korea Aerospace Research Institute
 National Aeronautical Research Institute
 National Institute of Aerospace

References

External links
 Official website

Aerospace research institutes
Aviation research institutes
Organisations based in Islamabad
2019 establishments in Pakistan
Pakistan Air Force
Research institutes in Pakistan
Foreign policy and strategy think tanks based in Pakistan